The 2004 Memorial Cup (branded as the 2004 Mastercard Memorial Cup for sponsorship reasons)  occurred May 15–23 at Prospera Place in Kelowna, British Columbia. It was the 86th annual Memorial Cup competition and determined the major junior ice hockey champion of the Canadian Hockey League (CHL).  It featured the host team, the Kelowna Rockets as well as the winners of the Ontario Hockey League, Quebec Major Junior Hockey League and the Western Hockey League which were the Guelph Storm, Gatineau Olympiques and the Medicine Hat Tigers respectively. The Kelowna Rockets would be the eventual winners, and would become only the fourth host team to win without winning their league as well. (The first time was in 1983, when the  Portland Winter Hawks won it, the second was in 1993 when the Sault Ste. Marie Greyhounds won it, and the third was in 1999 when the Ottawa 67's won it.) Kelowna defeated the Olympiques who made their second straight Memorial Cup final, but as with 2003, the 'Piques came up short. Kelowna also participated in the 2003 tournament as WHL champions but did not advance to the final, and would participate as WHL champions in the 2005 Memorial Cup as well.

Round-robin standings

Schedule
All times local (UTC -8)

Round-robin

Semi-final

Final

Winning team
Michal Blanar, Troy Bodie, Mike Card, Blake Comeau, Ryan Constant, Kyle Cumiskey, Darren Deschamps, Simon Ferguson, Randall Gelech, Josh Gorges, Kelly Guard, Joel Henituik, Brent Howarth, Justin Keller, D. J. King, Josh Lepp, Joni Lindlof, Tyler Mosienko, Mark Olafson, Cam Paddock, Brett Palin, Chris Ray, Kevin Reinholt, Tyler Spurgeon, Stephen Sunderman, Stewart Thiessen, Patrik Valcak, Nolan Waker, Shea Weber, Derek Yeomans. Coach: Marc Habscheid

Scoring leaders
Doug O'Brien, GAT (3g, 5a, 8pts)
Jean-Michel Daoust, GAT (1g, 6a, 7pts)
Nick Fugere, GAT (4g, 1a, 5pts)
Yanick Seidenberg, MH (1g, 4a, 5pts)
Randall Gelech, KEL (3g, 1a, 4pts)
Chris St. Jacques, MH (3g, 1a, 4pts)
Clarke MacArthur, MH (1g, 3a, 4pts)
Cam Paddock, KEL (1g, 3a, 4pts)
Shea Weber, KEL (1g, 3a, 4pts)

Goaltending leaders
Kelly Guard, KEL (0.75gaa, .971sv%)
Kevin Nastiuk, MH (2.77gaa, .888sv%)
David Tremblay, GAT (2.94gaa, .897sv%)
Adam Dennis, GUE (3.00gaa, .848sv%)

Award winners
Stafford Smythe Memorial Trophy (MVP): Kelly Guard, Kelowna
George Parsons Trophy (Sportsmanship): Josh Gorges, Kelowna
Hap Emms Memorial Trophy (Goaltender): Kelly Guard, Kelowna
Ed Chynoweth Trophy (Leading Scorer): Doug O'Brien, Gatineau

All-star team
Goal: Kelly Guard, Kelowna
Defence: Doug O'Brien, Gatineau; Shea Weber, Kelowna
Forwards: Jean-Michel Daoust, Gatineau; Clarke MacArthur, Medicine Hat; Randall Gelech, Kelowna

References

External links
 Memorial Cup 
 Canadian Hockey League

Memorial Cup 2004
Memorial Cup tournaments
Memorial Cup 2004